Niko Antonio Berry De Vera (born July 23, 1996) is a Filipino professional football player who plays as a left back. He last played for Portland Timbers 2 .

Career

Youth and collegiate
De Vera began his career in the youth academy of Portland Timbers in 2013. He made his professional debut in 2013 for the Timbers reserves at age 15. He also played four years of college soccer at the University of Akron between 2014 and 2017, appearing in 60 matches and scoring one goal and recording seven assists. While wearing the captains armband, he sent the zips to the final 4 scoring the winning penalty kick against Louisville. 

While in college, De Vera also appeared for Premier Development League side Portland Timbers U23s.

New York Red Bulls 
On January 19, 2018, De Vera was drafted in the second-round (31st overall) during the 2018 MLS SuperDraft by New York Red Bulls. On March 15, 2018, De Vera signed with New York Red Bulls. He made his professional debut on March 17, 2018 for United Soccer League side New York Red Bulls II, starting in a 2–1 win over Toronto FC II.

Portland Timbers 2
De Vera joined USL Championship side Portland Timbers 2 on January 30, 2019. Timbers 2 opted to stop operating following the 2020 season.

International career
De Vera was pre-called up by the Philippines in August 2019.

In October 2019, De Vera received a call-up for the Philippines, making the final 18 roster ahead of the 2022 FIFA World Cup qualifiers against China.

Career statistics

References

External links 
 
 

1996 births
Living people
Akron Zips men's soccer players
Association football defenders
New York Red Bulls draft picks
New York Red Bulls II players
People from Camas, Washington
Portland Timbers 2 players
Portland Timbers U23s players
Soccer players from Washington (state)
Citizens of the Philippines through descent
USL Championship players
USL League Two players
American soccer players
African-American soccer players
American sportspeople of Filipino descent
Azkals Development Team players